Josh James Brolin (born February 12, 1968) is an American actor. He has appeared in films such as The Goonies (1985), Mimic (1997), Hollow Man (2000), Grindhouse (2007), No Country for Old Men (2007), American Gangster (2007), W. (2008), Milk (2008), True Grit (2010), Wall Street: Money Never Sleeps (2010), and Men in Black 3 (2012). He has also appeared in films such as Oldboy (2013),  Inherent Vice (2014), Everest (2015), Sicario (2015), Hail, Caesar! (2016), and Deadpool 2 (2018) in addition to playing Marvel Comics supervillain Thanos in the Marvel Cinematic Universe.

In the MCU, he appeared as Thanos in Guardians of the Galaxy (2014), Avengers: Age of Ultron (2015) and later starring in Avengers: Infinity War (2018) and Avengers: Endgame (2019). In 2021, he returned to provide the voice for an alternate timeline version of Thanos in the animated series What If...? and portrayed Gurney Halleck in Denis Villeneuve's sci-fi epic Dune (2021) and in the upcoming sequel in 2023. In 2022, he starred in the supernatural mystery series Outer Range.

He is the recipient of several accolades, including a Critics' Choice Movie Award, a Screen Actors Guild Award, and a nomination for an Academy Award.

Early life 
Brolin was born on February 12, 1968, in Santa Monica, California, the son of Jane Cameron (Agee), a wildlife activist who was a native of Corpus Christi, Texas, and actor James Brolin. Brolin was raised on a ranch in Templeton, California, with little exposure to his father's acting career. His parents divorced in 1984, when he was 16 years old.

Brolin said in a 2014 interview that during his youth, he was a member of a surfing friendship group who called themselves the "Cito Rats". In his description of the group, he said, "It was Santa Barbara. It was the '80s. It was punk rock. You either had the children of rich, neglectful parents or children of poor, so it was a mix. But we basically grew up the same way. I've never seen a group like that before or since." He admitted to stealing cars to pay for his drug use, which included heroin, a drug that he explained he did not like: "I mean, I never got into it and I never died from it, which is a good thing. I've had 19 friends who died. Most of those guys I grew up with, they're all dead now."

Career

Acting 

Brolin started his career in TV films and guest roles on TV shows before landing a more notable role as Brandon Walsh in the Richard Donner-directed film The Goonies (1985). He was considered for the role of Tom Hanson in the series 21 Jump Street; he and Johnny Depp were the finalists for the role, and the two became close and remained friends. The role ultimately went to Depp. Brolin guest-starred in an episode of the show in its first season.

Brolin played a small role in the 1994 movie Roadflower. He has implied that he turned away from film acting for years after the premiere of his second film, Thrashin', where he witnessed what he called "horrendous" acting on his part. For several years, he appeared in stage roles in Rochester, New York, often alongside mentor and friend Anthony Zerbe. One of Brolin's more prominent roles early in his career was that of "Wild Bill" Hickok in the ABC western TV series The Young Riders, which lasted three seasons (1989–92). Two other TV series he was involved in include the Aaron Spelling production Winnetka Road (1994) and Mister Sterling (2003), both of which were cancelled after a few episodes.

Brolin's film work consists of many villainous roles in late-2000s/early-2010s films, including Planet Terror (one of two feature-length segments of the Quentin Tarantino/Robert Rodriguez collaboration Grindhouse), American Gangster, and Oliver Stone's Wall Street: Money Never Sleeps. He also played the lead role in the Coen brothers' Academy Award-winning film No Country for Old Men.

In 2008, Brolin starred in another Oliver Stone film, W., a biopic about key events in the life of President George W. Bush. Stone pursued an initially hesitant Brolin for the role. He said of his decision to cast Brolin in the leading role:

Brolin received an Oscar nomination for Best Supporting Actor for his role in Gus Van Sant's biopic Milk as city supervisor Dan White, who assassinated San Francisco Supervisor Harvey Milk and Mayor George Moscone. He made news by wearing a White Knot to the Academy Awards ceremony to demonstrate solidarity with the same-sex marriage movement. Brolin told an interviewer that co-star Sean Penn, who portrayed Milk, decided to dispel any nerves the actors had about playing gay men by "grabbing the bull by the horns". At the first cast dinner, which included castmates James Franco, Emile Hirsch and Diego Luna, "[Penn] walked right up and grabbed me and planted a huge one right on my lips", Brolin said. Brolin has received critical acclaim for his performance and, in addition to his Oscar nomination, received NYFCC and NBR Awards for Best Supporting Actor and a nomination for a SAG Award for Outstanding Performance by a Male Actor in a Supporting Role.
In 2010, Brolin portrayed the titular character in Jonah Hex, based on the DC Comics' character with the same name. Brolin later played the younger version of Tommy Lee Jones's character Kevin Brown / Agent K in Men in Black 3 in 2012, which reunited both Brolin and Jones after their initial collaboration in No Country for Old Men and In the Valley of Elah, both in 2007. Brolin later starred in the 2013 film Gangster Squad, portraying a fictional World War II veteran named John O'Mara. He also portrayed Joe Doucett in Oldboy, a remake of the 2003 South Korean film of the same name.

Brolin was one of the actors who was considered for the role of Bruce Wayne / Batman in the DC Extended Universe, a deal which would have begun with Zack Snyder's Batman v Superman: Dawn of Justice, but Ben Affleck was chosen for the role instead. The following year, it was announced that Brolin would play Thanos within the Marvel Cinematic Universe. He portrays the character through motion capture performance, as well as voice acting. He cameoed as the character in Guardians of the Galaxy (2014) and Avengers: Age of Ultron (2015), and then reprised Thanos in a starring role in Avengers: Infinity War (2018) and 2019's Avengers: Endgame, which were filmed back-to-back.

In April 2017, Brolin signed a four-film contract with 20th Century Fox studios to portray the Marvel Comics character Nathan Summers / Cable in the X-Men film series. 2018's Deadpool 2 is his first installment within that contract. He was set to reprise his role in Fox's planned X-Force movie until the acquisition of 20th Century Fox by Disney.

In 2021, Brolin voiced an alternate Thanos in What If...?

Writing and directing 
In 2009, Brolin executive produced and performed in The People Speak, a documentary feature film that uses dramatic and musical performances of the letters, diaries, and speeches of everyday Americans, based on historian Howard Zinn's A People's History of the United States.

Brolin wrote and directed the short film X as his directorial debut. The film, about an inmate who escapes prison to reunite with his daughter and search for her murdered mother. It was the opening film at the first annual Union City International Film Festival in Union City, New Jersey in December 2010.

Personal life

Marriages and family 

Brolin was married to actress Alice Adair from 1988 until 1994; they have two children, son Trevor and daughter Eden, both actors. He was engaged to actress Minnie Driver for six months. He married actress Diane Lane on August 15, 2004. Brolin and Lane divorced in 2013.

In March 2013, Brolin began dating his former assistant and model Kathryn Boyd. They became engaged in March 2015. The couple married on September 24, 2016, and announced on May 29, 2018, that they were expecting their first child. Brolin announced through Instagram on November 4, 2018, that Boyd had given birth to a daughter. Their second daughter was born on December 25, 2020.

Legal issues 
On December 20, 2004, Brolin's wife at the time, Diane Lane, called the police after an altercation with him, and he was arrested on a misdemeanor charge of domestic battery. Lane declined to press charges and the couple's spokesman characterized the incident as a misunderstanding.

On July 12, 2008, Brolin was arrested after an altercation at the Stray Cat Bar in Shreveport, Louisiana, along with actor Jeffrey Wright and five other men who were crew members of W. Brolin was released after posting a cash bond of $334. Brolin said to a reporter, "It was nice to be in jail knowing that I hadn't done anything wrong. And it was maddening to be in jail knowing that I hadn't done anything wrong." Charges against all seven men were later dropped by Shreveport prosecutors.

Brolin was arrested for public intoxication on New Year's Day 2013 in Santa Monica, California. The remainder of 2013 proved very difficult for him, and he later explained: "Well, it was another turning point. It made me think of a lot of things. My mom dying when I was in my twenties. All the impact that had on me that I hadn't moved past; I was always such a mama's boy. But I realized that I was on a destructive path. I knew that I had to change and mature."

Business interests 
Brolin commenced in stock trading in his mid-20s and briefly considered quitting acting. In 2014, he explained he made a large amount of money over a three-year period: "Fear and greed, that's all that there is. And I traded very specifically. I found momentum stocks that had room to breathe and I just grab a little of the breath." He was also co-founder of a now defunct stock trading website.

Filmography

Awards and nominations

References

External links 

 Josh-Brolin.com
 
 

1968 births
Living people
20th-century American male actors
21st-century American male actors
American male child actors
American male film actors
American male stage actors
American male television actors
American male voice actors
Male actors from Santa Monica, California
Male actors from Texas
Male Western (genre) film actors
Outstanding Performance by a Cast in a Motion Picture Screen Actors Guild Award winners